Siddhānta Śiromaṇi  (Sanskrit: सिद्धान्त शिरोमणि for "Crown of treatises") is the major treatise of Indian mathematician Bhāskara II. He wrote the Siddhānta Śiromaṇi in 1150 when he was 36 years old. The work is composed in Sanskrit Language in 1450 verses.

Parts

Līlāvatī

The name of the book comes from his daughter, Līlāvatī. It is the first volume of the Siddhānta Śiromaṇi. The book contains thirteen chapters, 278 verses, mainly arithmetic and measurement.

Bījagaṇita

It is the second volume of Siddhānta Śiromaṇi. It is divided into six parts, contains 213 verses and is devoted to algebra.

Gaṇitādhyāya and Golādhyāya 

Gaṇitādhyāya and Golādhyāya of Siddhānta Śiromaṇi are devoted to astronomy. All put together there are about 900 verses. (Gaṇitādhyāya has 451 and Golādhyāya has 501 verses).

Translations 

In 1797, Safdar Ali Khan of Hyderbad translated the Siddhanta Shiromani into Persian as Zij-i Sarumani. The translation is now a lost work, and is known only from a mention in Khan's other work - Zij-i Safdari.

References

Bibliography

External links 
 Scan of reprint A 1917 edition

Indian mathematics
Social history of India
Science and technology in India
History of algebra
1150s books
Indian astronomy texts
Sanskrit texts